Julie Dawn Cole (born 26 October 1957) is an English actress. She began her career as a child performer in the 1971 film Willy Wonka & the Chocolate Factory, playing Veruca Salt.

Career

Willy Wonka and the Chocolate Factory
Raised in Guildford, Surrey, Cole was twelve when she was cast in the supporting role during the project's pre-production phase in the first half of 1970, which was filmed at the Bavaria Film Studios.

The film debuted in New York City on 30 June 1971 and in London the following week, and Cole was chosen to present a bouquet of flowers to Princess Margaret at the Royal Premiere. She and Willy Wonkas other pre-adolescent "leading lady", American Denise Nickerson (Violet Beauregarde), both had crushes on Peter Ostrum (Charlie Bucket), also an American, and alternated days spending time with him while there were breaks in filming. The "I Want It Now" sequence was filmed on her 13th birthday and Cole was given three film props: a golden egg prop, a golden ticket, and an Everlasting Gobstopper. Although Cole actually sang the song "I Want It Now", she recorded her vocals in a music studio on a separate session and mimed to the track during filming. Cole has stated that her character in the film was based on a girl who attended the same boarding school she did.

Following the filming of the movie, Cole kept the Golden Ticket prop, along with the accompanying Wonka bar prop. She later gave it to her friend Linda Carr. On 17 July 2019, both props were sold at auction for upwards of £15,000.

After Willy Wonka
Immediately after returning from Willy Wonka, Cole was cast in a re-occurring role on the ITV sitcom, ...And Mother Makes Three, in which she played Arabella, a stuck up and snobbish teenaged girl. After the success of the show, Cole continued to have a series of steady job offers.

From 1971 to 1974 she acted in several TV series, and was often cast as a 'bad girl': in an episode of ITV series Saturday Night Theatre she played a delinquent who broke into a house; and a juvenile offender in an episode of prison drama series Within These Walls. Occasionally she was cast in other moulds, on an episode of the Orson Welles' Great Mysteries series, she played a murder victim.

She made her next theatrical appearance in British-German comedy film That Lucky Touch, opposite Roger Moore. In this film she played the daughter of the characters played by Shelley Winters and Lee J. Cobb. Julie also found recognition playing Alice (from Alice In Wonderland) in a two-minute Christmas commercial for Woolworths.

In 1975, Cole got her breakout role being cast as one of the leading characters in BBC medical drama Angels. Breaking the bad-girl mould, she played Jo Longhurst, a second-year student nurse. Her character was known for her compassion, kind nature, advocacy for patients, and challenging authority when it was questionable. Production of the show began in February 1975, and episodes started to air in September of that same year. Cole's run on the show lasted three years.

In 1976, Cole joined the cast of the costume drama Poldark for its second season. Reverting to her bad-girl mould, Cole played the salacious and lecherous Rowella Chynoweth, who engages in an affair with her brother-in-law (played by Christopher Biggins). Poldark was immensely popular and garnered much attention for its romantic, and at times racy, plot lines.

Her other credits include the Children's Film Foundation film Paganini Strikes Again (1973), a 1982 episode of Tales of the Unexpected ("The Skeleton Key"), and the 1984 TV film of Camille, starring Greta Scacchi and Colin Firth. She featured as 'Robot 35' in the CBBC comedy Galloping Galaxies!.

She has a number of theatrical credits as well as pantomime and voice-over work. Cole has appeared on radio in BBC Radio 2 broadcasts of British panto, including the 26 December 1979 broadcast of Puss in Boots as "Princess Rosepetal", as "Jill" in the 25 December 1981 broadcast of Mother Goose, and as "Alice" in the 27 December 1982 broadcast of Dick Whittington.

As of 2001, Cole works as a psychotherapist.

After qualifying in 1998 as a fitness instructor, she worked in the 2000s on various projects, including the 2005 ITV series Fat Families as fitness advisor to one of the title families. In 2006, she was seen on the soap opera Emmerdale.

In 2004, Cole guest-starred in a Melbourne Comedy Festival show, Willy Wonka Explained (The Search for Veruca Salt). This led to Cole co-starring in the 2010 Edinburgh Fringe show, Willy Wonka Revisited: The Veruca Salt Sessions, where she plays a semi-fictional version of herself discussing Veruca, life, and obsessive fans with her unseen therapist, while her co-star plays an Australian fan describing his obsession with Veruca to his unseen therapist.

In 2016, Cole released the book I Want It Now!, a memoir about her time filming Willy Wonka.

Personal life
Cole met actor Nick Wilton in 1988, at the revival of the Whitehall farce Dry Rot. They married in 1991 and have two children together; they divorced in 2002.

Filmography

References

External links

Julie Dawn Cole filmography as compiled by the British Film Institute
Julie Dawn Cole interviewed for the 40th anniversary of the Willie Wonka film (CNN)
Julie Dawn Cole's autobiography, I Want It Now!

1957 births
Living people
20th-century English actresses
21st-century English actresses
21st-century English writers
21st-century English women writers
21st-century memoirists
Actors from Guildford
Actresses from Surrey
British women memoirists
English child actresses
English film actresses
English television actresses